Ravenswood is a city in Jackson County, West Virginia, United States, along the Ohio River. The population was 3,865 at the 2020 census.

Geography
Ravenswood is located at  (38.952922, -81.761357), along the Ohio River at the mouth of Sandy Creek.

Demographics

2010 census
As of the census of 2010, there were 3,876 people, 1,657 households, and 1,061 families living in the city. The racial makeup of the city was 97.4% White, 0.2% African American, 0.1% Native American, 0.7% Asian, 0.2% from other races, and 1.3% from two or more races. Hispanic or Latino of any race were 1.0% of the population.

There were 1,657 households, of which 29.3% had children under the age of 18 living with them, 45.7% were married couples living together, 14.3% had a female householder with no husband present, 4.0% had a male householder with no wife present, and 36.0% were non-families. 32.0% of all households were made up of individuals, and 17.8% had someone living alone who was 65 years of age or older. The average household size was 2.30 and the average family size was 2.90.

The median age in the city was 42.4 years. 23% of residents were under the age of 18; 8.4% were between the ages of 18 and 24; 21.4% were from 25 to 44; 23.9% were from 45 to 64; and 23.1% were 65 years of age or older. The gender makeup of the city was 46.6% male and 53.4% female.

2000 census
As of the census of 2000, there were 4,031 people, 1,692 households, and 1,135 families living in the city. The population density was 2,190.1 people per square mile (845.9/km2). There were 1,832 housing units at an average density of 995.4 per square mile (384.4/km2). The racial makeup of the city was 98.04% White, 0.25% African American, 0.05% Native American, 0.74% Asian, 0.15% from other races, and 0.77% from two or more races. Hispanic or Latino of any race were 0.60% of the population.

There were 1,692 households, out of which 29.3% had children under the age of 18 living with them, 52.5% were married couples living together, 12.4% had a female householder with no husband present, and 32.9% were non-families. 30.4% of all households were made up of individuals, and 15.1% had someone living alone who was 65 years of age or older. The average household size was 2.29 and the average family size was 2.83.

In the city, the population was spread out, with 23.6% under the age of 18, 6.6% from 18 to 24, 23.5% from 25 to 44, 22.7% from 45 to 64, and 23.5% who were 65 years of age or older. The median age was 42 years. For every 100 females, there were 84.2 males. For every 100 females age 18 and over, there were 77.1 males.

The median income for a household in the city was $30,308, and the median income for a family was $37,416. Males had a median income of $34,417 versus $21,134 for females. The per capita income for the city was $15,696. About 15.4% of families and 17.6% of the population were below the poverty line, including 26.4% of those under age 18 and 9.7% of those age 65 or over.

Education
Primary and secondary public education is provided by Jackson County Schools.  Ravenswood public schools include Henry J. Kaiser Elementary School (Grades K-2), Ravenswood Grade School (Grades 3–5), Ravenswood Middle School (Grades 6–8), and Ravenswood High School (9-12).  Ravenswood Grade School is located about  miles outside of the town limits.  The other schools are located within the town boundaries. The official mascot of Ravenswood High School is the Red Devil. Lower-level schools are referred to as Demons.  Private school education is provided by the Heritage Christian Academy (Grades K-12).

History
Ravenswood is sited on land once owned by George Washington. Washington acquired the  parcel in 1770, and designated Colonel William Crawford to survey the lands in 1771. A permanent settlement was first established in 1810, and the town streets and lots were laid out in their current pattern by descendants of Washington in 1835.

When Kaiser Aluminum planned a new facility with 12,000 workers, Bill Finley was hired to plan a "company town" of 25,000. He went on to become a planner with the National Capital Planning Commission, and develop the community of Columbia, Maryland, for the Rouse Company. The Kaiser facility is now owned by Constellium and Century Aluminum.

In February 2010, USA Today referred to Ravenswood as "teetering on a ghost town". Mayor Lucy Harbert responded by bringing in sponsorships from several Silicon Valley-based companies like ScanCafe.com and StartUps.com. On March 26, 2010, Mike Ruben, a reporter with the State Journal newspaper, announced that Ravenswood was "transforming" the town into "Aluminum City, U.S.A." to help attract local tourism revenue: "L.A. Promoter Plans to Market 'Aluminum City'."  None of these developments came to fruition.

2020 elections
The most recent municipal election was held on June 12, 2020. All incumbents were returned to serve another term. The council members are as follows:
 Amanda Slaven
 Dee Scritchfield
 Denise Toler
 Steve Tucker
 Nick Fox
Elected as City Recorder was Jared Bloxton.
Elected as Mayor was Josh Miller.

Voters also voted to lengthen elected terms from two to four years.

Other significant dates
 1840 – First election held in the home of Bartholomew Fleming.
 1852 – Ravenswood incorporated in the state of Virginia.
 1863 – Ravenswood becomes part of West Virginia when a proclamation by President Abraham Lincoln admits West Virginia to the Union.
 1863 – The Battle of Buffington Island, the only major battle of the Civil War fought in Ohio, takes place one mile (1.6 km) north of Ravenswood.
 1886 – The Ohio River Rail Road reaches Ravenswood.
 1892 – The Ravenswood, Spencer and Glenville Railroad is completed to Spencer.
 1931 – Opening of the Ravenswood Glass Novelty Company ("The Marble Factory").
 1957 – Henry J. Kaiser opens the world's largest aluminum refinery six miles south of Ravenswood.
 1960 Presidential Candidate John F. Kennedy visits Ravenswood during the Primary Election campaign.
 1964 – The Ravenswood exit of Interstate 77 opens
 1990 – Robert L. Dittmar, resident and former mayor of Ravenswood, gets elected to West Virginia state senate.

History museum
 Great Bend Museum (Operated by the City of Ravenswood and since 2020)

The Museum is now under the oversight of Faith Walker who serves as the curator, director, project manager and oversees all the things.

Climate
The climate in this area is characterized by relatively high temperatures and evenly distributed precipitation throughout the year.  According to the Köppen Climate Classification system, Ravenswood has a Humid subtropical climate, abbreviated "Cfa" on climate maps.

Place name lore
Two differing stories tell of the naming of Ravenswood.  One story tells that the town was originally named Ravensworth, after the English relatives of a founding family.  But somewhere between the Ohio River wilderness and the mapmaker in Richmond, the name was changed to Ravenswood.  The second story says that Henrietta Fitzhugh, wife of one of the town founders, Henry Fitzhugh, named the town after the hero in Walter Scott's novel The Bride of Lammermoor (1819).

See also
 List of cities and towns along the Ohio River

References

External links

Cities in West Virginia
Cities in Jackson County, West Virginia
West Virginia populated places on the Ohio River